Ertzica is a genus of snout moths. It was described by Francis Walker in 1866.

Species
 Ertzica morosella (Walker, 1863)
 Ertzica dohrni (E. Hering, 1903)

References

Tirathabini
Pyralidae genera